is a 2013 Japanese tokusatsu film directed by Noboru Iguchi and starring Shoko Nakagawa.

Cast
 Shoko Nakagawa as Yumeko Aikawa, a gothic lolita fashionista
 Rina Takeda as Kill Billy, Takeshi's sidekick; and Nuiguruma, Yumeko's superhero alter-ego
 Sadao Abe as voice of Busuke, Yumeko's pink teddy bear
 Mao Ichimichi as Kyoko, Yumeko's niece
 Hiroshi Neko as Takeshi, the villain who plans to take over the world with 109 zombies
 Koto Takagi
 Honoka Kitahara
 Jiji Boo
 Takumi Saito
 Kami Hiraiwa
 Koichi Yamadera as Deparuza Charlie, a black teddy bear.

Production
The film is based on a book by Kenji Ohtsuki, member of the rock band Tokusatsu.

Release
The film had its American debut at the 15th Hawaii International Film Festival on October 18, 2013.

References

External links

Tokusatsu films
Films directed by Noboru Iguchi
Japanese zombie films
2013 films
2010s Japanese films